A Drink and a Quick Decision is the second album from British duo Grand National. The album was first released as a digital download on 18 June 2007, then released on CD and 12" vinyl 11 September 2007 in the US, and 8 March 2008 in the UK. The US edition of the album comes with the bonus track "Old Man," a Neil Young cover, a music video by Steven Compton for "Old Man" consisting mostly of the band recording the song, and an enhanced video of "By the Time I Get Home There Won't Be Much of a Place for Me." Meanwhile, the UK CD, Japanese CD, and vinyl pressings of the album come with the song "Pieces Pieces," and the UK version does not include "Old Man."

In the UK, "Animal Sounds" and "By the Time I Get Home There Won't Be Much of a Place for Me" were released as singles on 7" vinyl and digital download only.

The album takes on a darker tone than their debut Kicking the National Habit from 2004. Billboard Magazine described the album as "an indie rocker's idea of Saturday Night Fever," and Stylus Magazine described the song "Joker and Clown" as "one of 2007's best ballads." As listed on the album's sleeve, "Joker and Clown" is dedicated to Andrew Baty (1970–2007), a friend who died while the duo was recording the new album.

The title of the album is a lyric taken from the hit song "She's Gone" by Hall & Oates.

"Cut by the Brakes" contains a sample of "Mit Dir" by Robert Görl.

"Going to Switch the Lights On" is based around a sample of the title track of The J. Geils Band album Monkey Island.

Track listing

US version

UK version

References

2007 albums
2008 albums
Grand National (band) albums
Recall Records albums
Sunday Best (music company) albums